The 1990 Country Music Association Awards, 24th Ceremony, was held on Monday October 8, 1990, at the Grand Ole Opry House, Nashville, Tennessee, and was hosted by CMA Award Winners, Reba McEntire and Randy Travis.

Winners and nominees 
Winners are in Bold.

Hall of Fame

Performers

Presenters

References 

Country Music Association
CMA
Country Music Association Awards
Country Music Association Awards
Country Music Association Awards
Country Music Association Awards
20th century in Nashville, Tennessee
Events in Nashville, Tennessee